Jerry Dean Jewell is an American voice actor and voice director who works on anime series for Funimation and OkraTron 5000. He has performed the voices for several anime roles and is noted for his roles as Kyo Sohma in the Fruits Basket series, ace detective Jimmy Kudo in Case Closed, Caesar Clown in One Piece, Barry the Chopper in the Fullmetal Alchemist series, Russia in Hetalia, Lyon Vastia in Fairy Tail, Viktor Nikiforov in Yuri!! on Ice, Kusuo Saiki in The Disastrous Life of Saiki K. and Natsuno Yuki in Shiki. Jewell became a full-time ADR director for Funimation in 2013.

Filmography

Anime

Film

Video games

References

External links
 
 
 
 

Living people
American male voice actors
American male video game actors
American voice directors
Funimation
Male actors from Fort Worth, Texas
People from Fort Smith, Arkansas
People from Fort Worth, Texas
Male actors from Arkansas
Year of birth missing (living people)
21st-century American male actors